Björn Peter Gärdenfors (born 21 September 1949) is professor of cognitive science at the University of Lund, Sweden. 

Gärdenfors is a recipient of the Gad Rausing Prize (Swedish: Rausingpriset). He received his doctorate from Lund University in 1974. Internationally, he is one of Sweden's most notable philosophers. In 1996, he was elected a member of the Royal Swedish Academy of Letters, History and Antiquities and in 2009 he became a member of Royal Swedish Academy of Sciences. He is member of Deutsche Akademie für Naturforscher and of Academia Europaea. In 2014 Gärdenfors was awarded a Senior Fellowship of the Zukunftskolleg at the University of Konstanz. He was a member of the Prize Committee for the Prize in Economic Sciences in Memory of Alfred Nobel 2011-2017.

Peter Gärdenfors' research covers several areas: Belief revision, decision theory, philosophy of science, concept formation, conceptual spaces, cognitive semantics, and the evolution of cognition and language.

His son Simon Gärdenfors is a famous cartoonist and rapper.

Writings
 
 
 
 
 
Knowledge in Flux: Modeling the Dynamics of Epistemic States. Cambridge, Massachusetts: MIT Press. .

See also
 Conceptual space

References

External links
Vitterhetsakademien
Homepage at Lund University

Lecture videos
 What is Life? Evolutionary and developmental aspects of intersubjectivity. Talk at Karolinska Institutet, February 20, 2008. 
 How to Motivate Students? TEDxNorrkoping

1949 births
Living people
Academic staff of Lund University
Members of the Royal Swedish Academy of Sciences
Fellows of the Cognitive Science Society